The Hills Grammar School (commonly referred to as Hills Grammar) is an independent nonsectarian co-educational early learning, primary and secondary day school, located in Kenthurst, a suburb in the Hills district of Sydney, New South Wales, Australia.

Established in 1982, the school has a non-selective enrolment policy and currently caters for over 1,000 students from early learning, through Year K to  Year 12. In 2010, the school opened the Early Childhood Education Centre (ECEC), catering for 3–4 year olds. Main intake years are ECEC, Year K, Year 7, and Year 11; however, if vacancies exist in other years, admissions can be made.

Hills Grammar is affiliated with the Association of Heads of Independent Schools of Australia (AHISA), the Heads of Independent Co-Educational Schools (HICES) and the Junior School Heads Association of Australia (JSHAA).

Notable alumni 

Rachael Carpani, actress
Joel Edgerton, actor, writer, producer
Nash Edgerton, actor, director, producer
Delta Goodrem, musician
Andrew Hansen, comedian
Alex Hawke, politician
Michelle Jenneke, athlete
Robert Ovadia, journalist

See also 

 List of non-government schools in New South Wales

References

External links 
 The Hills Grammar School

Private primary schools in Sydney
Educational institutions established in 1983
Junior School Heads Association of Australia Member Schools
1982 establishments in Australia
The Hills Shire
Grammar schools in Australia
International Baccalaureate schools in Australia
Private secondary schools in Sydney